Dhammachakra Pravartan Din or Dhammachakra Pravartan Diwas (translation: Dhamma Wheel's Promulgation Day) is a Buddhist festival in India. This is the day to celebrate the Buddhist conversion of B. R. Ambedkar and his approximately 600,000 followers on 14 October 1956 at Deekshabhoomi, Nagpur.

Dhammachakra Pravartan Din is a day when the architect of the Indian Constitution Dr. Babasaheb Ambedkar renounced Hinduism and accepted Buddhism. It is primarily celebrated at Deeksha Bhoomi every year.

Every year on Ashoka Vijayadashami, millions of Buddhists gather at Deekshabhoomi to celebrate the mass conversion. October 2016 marked the Diamond Jubilee.

Every year, thousands of people convert to Buddhism on Dhammachakra Pravartan Din and Ashoka Vijayadashami at Deekshbhoomi, Nagpur. Here in 2018, around 65,000 people and in 2019, 67,543 people converted to Buddhism.

See also
 Ambedkar Jayanti
 Buddha's birthday
 Marathi Buddhists

References

Memorials to B. R. Ambedkar
Buddhist festivals in India
Buddhist holidays
Navayana
Buddhism in Maharashtra
History of Vidarbha
History of Nagpur